Kjersti Elvik (born 9 March 1969) is a Norwegian actress, born in Bergen. She was educated at the Norwegian National Academy of Theatre, and started her career at Trøndelag Teater. Elvik had her breakthrough in the popular Norwegian TV-series "Vestavind", but is probably best known for her role as Hanne Wilhelmsen in the filmatisation of Anne Holt's crime novels Salige er de som tørster and Blind gudinne. She also acted in the television sitcom Seks som Oss on TV2 from 2004 to 2007. In 2009 she starred in Mamma Mia, in the role of Rosy, at Folketeateret in Oslo. She is married and has one child.

Filmography
Snøfall (2016) TV Series
Varg Veum – Kvinnen i kjøleskapet (2008)
Hawaii, Oslo (2004)
Den som frykter ulven (2004–07)
Seks som oss (2004) TV Series
Salige er de som tørster (1997)
Blind gudinne (1997) (TV)
Vestavind (1994) (mini) TV Series

Awards and nominations

References

External links

1969 births
Living people
Actors from Bergen
Norwegian stage actresses
Norwegian television actresses
Norwegian film actresses
Norwegian musical theatre actresses